Minuscule 523 (in the Gregory-Aland numbering), ε 145 (in the Soden numbering), is a Greek minuscule manuscript of the New Testament, on a parchment. Palaeographically it has been assigned to the 14th century. 
Scrivener labelled it by number 489. It was adapted for liturgical use, with full marginalia.

Description 

The codex contains the complete text of the four Gospels on 270 parchment leaves (size ). It is written in one column per page, 22 lines per page.

There is also a division according to the Ammonian Sections, with references to the Eusebian Canons.

It lacks the Pericope Adulterae (John 7:53–8:11).

Text 

The Greek text of the codex is a representative of the Byzantine text-type. Hermann von Soden classified it to the textual family Kx. Aland placed it in Category V.

According to the Claremont Profile Method it represents textual family Kx in Luke 1 and Luke 20. In Luke 10 no profile was made.

History 

The manuscript once belonged to M. Aloys. Canonici, together with the manuscripts 522, 524, and 525, then to Bandinelli from Venice, and in 1817 was acquired by the Bodleian Library.

The manuscript was added to the list of New Testament minuscule manuscripts by Scrivener (489) and Gregory (523). Gregory saw it in 1883.

It is currently housed at the Bodleian Library (MS. Canon. Gr. 36) in Oxford.

See also 

 List of New Testament minuscules
 Biblical manuscript
 Textual criticism

References

Further reading 

 

Greek New Testament minuscules
14th-century biblical manuscripts
Bodleian Library collection